Nikolai Ivanovich Solodukhin (born 3 January 1955) is a Russian judoka.

He was born in Kursk Oblast.

He competed for the Soviet Union in the 1980 Summer Olympics, where he won a gold medal in the half lightweight class. In the 1983 World Judo Championships he won gold in the -65 kilogram class.

External links
 

1955 births
Living people
Russian male judoka
Soviet male judoka
Olympic judoka of the Soviet Union
Judoka at the 1980 Summer Olympics
Olympic gold medalists for the Soviet Union
Olympic medalists in judo
Medalists at the 1980 Summer Olympics
Sportspeople from Kursk Oblast